Bosque County is a county located on the Edwards Plateau in the U.S. state of Texas.  As of the 2020 census, the population was 18,235.  Its county seat is Meridian, while Clifton is the largest city and the cultural/financial center of the county. The county is named for the Bosque River, which runs through the center of the county north to south. The Brazos River makes up the eastern border along with the Lake Whitney reservoir it feeds.

Since 2015, Bosque County has been represented in the Texas House of Representatives by the Republican DeWayne Burns. The previous 10-year representative was the Republican Rob Orr of Burleson.

History 
In 1721, while traveling from San Antonio de Béxar to a mission in East Texas, the Marqués de San Miguel de Aguayo ventured north from the Old San Antonio Road, and camped along the Brazos River. Near his camp was also a tributary of the Brazos, which he named the Bosque, Spanish for forest. This was the first recorded European expedition through the region.

Until the 1850s, settlement of the region that was to become Bosque County remained sparse. About a decade previous, some members of the ill-fated Texan Santa-Fe Expedition of 1841, which passed through the area, chose to stay.  One particularly noteworthy attempt at settlement was the town of Kent. In 1850, the Universal Immigration Company of England purchased land for a townsite on the west side of the Brazos. After several years, 30 families were sent over by the company to settle the land, but the newly established community barely survived the first winter, suffering a number of fatalities. The following spring, the settlers planned to right the course of the settlement by purchasing some cattle and seed corn. This plan, too, would go awry, as the cattle would eat the corn before it could be harvested, because no fence was built around the corn. Eventually, the town of Kent dissolved, with most of the settlers choosing to go elsewhere, including some who returned to England.

Bosque County was officially created in 1854, being separated from McLennan County. The first election included 3 ballot boxes: one at the junction of Steele Creek and the Brazos River, one in Meridian, and another at a live oak between Clifton and Valley Mills. This live oak became known as the Bosque County Oak. Locally the oak is known as the "Election Oak".

The voters at the first election were L. H. Scrutchfield, J. K. Helton, J. N. Mabray, Capt. Underhill, James Mabray, William Gary, Gafey Gary, Isaac Gary, Matt Gary, John Robertson, John Thomas, F. M. Kell, Archie Kell, William McCurry, Jack McCurry, Lum McCurry, Samuel Locker, Nathaniel Morgan, R. S. Barnes, J. P. Locker. They elected the following county officers: L. H. Scrutchfield, Judge; P. Bryant, Sheriff; J. N. Mabray, Clerk; Isaac Gary, Assessor and Collector; Archabal Kell, Treasurer.

Geography

Major highways
  State Highway 6
  State Highway 22
  State Highway 144
  State Highway 174

Adjacent counties
 Somervell County (north)
 Johnson County (northeast)
 Hill County (east)
 McLennan County (southeast)
 Coryell County (south)
 Hamilton County (west)
 Erath County (northwest)

Demographics

Note: the US Census treats Hispanic/Latino as an ethnic category. This table excludes Latinos from the racial categories and assigns them to a separate category. Hispanics/Latinos can be of any race.

As of the census of 2000,  17,204 people, 6,726 households, and 4,856 families were residing in the county.  The population density was 17 people/sq mi (7/km2).  The 8,644 housing units averaged 9/sq mi (3/km2).  The racial makeup of the county was 90.75% White, 1.92% African American, 0.55% Native American, 0.11% Asian,  5.2% from other races, and 1.47% from two or more races.  About 12.23% of the population were Hispanic or Latino of any race.

Of the 6,726 households,  29.5% had children under  18 living with them, 60.6% were married couples living together, 8.2% had a female householder with no husband present, and 27.8% were not families. About 25.4% of all households were made up of individuals, and 14.1% had someone living alone who was 65 or older.  The average household size was 2.48, and the average family size was 2.95.

A Williams Institute analysis of 2010 census data found about 2.5 same-sex couples per 1,000 households in the county.

In the county, the age distribution was 24.4% under 18, 6.2% from 18 to 24, 23.8% from 25 to 44, 25.0% from 45 to 64, and 20.5% who were 65  or older.  The median age was 42 years. For every 100 females, there were 95.90 males.  For every 100 females age 18 and over, there were 92.30 males.

The median income for a household in the county was $34,181, and for a family was $40,763. Males had a median income of $31,669 versus $21,739 for females. The per capita income for the county was $17,455.  About 8.9% of families and 12.7% of the population were below the poverty line, including 16.8% of those under 18 and 14.6% of those 65 or over.

Media
Bosque County is currently listed as part of the Dallas-Fort Worth DMA. Local media outlets include: KDFW-TV, KXAS-TV, WFAA-TV, KTVT-TV, KERA-TV, KTXA-TV, KDFI-TV, KDAF-TV, and KFWD-TV. Although located in Central Texas and a neighboring county of the Waco and Killeen – Temple – Fort Hood metropolitan areas. Meaning all of the Waco/Temple/Killeen market stations also provide coverage for Bosque County. They include: KCEN-TV, KWTX-TV, KXXV-TV, KDYW, and KWKT-TV.

Newspapers include The Clinton Record and Meridian Tribune, both run by BosqueCountyToday.com, whose publisher is Rita Hamilton.

Politics

Communities

Cities
 Clifton
 Cranfills Gap (small part in Hamilton County)
 Iredell
 Meridian (county seat)
 Morgan
 Valley Mills (small part in McLennan County)
 Walnut Springs

Census-designated places
 Kopperl
 Laguna Park
 Mosheim

Unincorporated communities
 Cayote
 Cedar Shores
 Eulogy
 Lakeside Village
 Norse
 Smith Bend
 Womack

Notable residents
 Jacob De Cordova, land agent, member of Texas House of Representatives, 1808–1868
 Calvin Maples Cureton, Texas attorney general from 1919 to 1921, Texas chief justice 1921–1940
 James T. Draper Jr., Texas Southern Baptist clergyman was a pastor in Iredell in Bosque County in the late 1950s.
 James E. Ferguson 26th governor of Texas
 Miriam A. Ferguson, James' wife and the 29th and 32nd governor of Texas
 Earle Bradford Mayfield, Texas state senator, United States senator
 John Lomax, American musicologist and folklorist

See also

 National Register of Historic Places listings in Bosque County, Texas
 Recorded Texas Historic Landmarks in Bosque County

References

Bibliography 
 Bosque County History Book Committee, Bosque County, Land and People (Dallas: Curtis Media, 1985).
 Bosquerama, 1854-1954: Centennial Celebration of Bosque County, Texas (Meridian, Texas: Bosque County Centennial Association, 1954).
 William C. Pool, A History of Bosque County (San Marcos, Texas: San Marcos Record Press, 1954).
 William C. Pool, Bosque Territory (Kyle, Texas: Chaparral, 1964).

External links

 Official website for Bosque County
 
 Bosque County from the  Texas Almanac
 Bosque County from the TXGenWeb Project
 Bosque County Collection The Archives of the Bosque County Historical Commission.
 View historic materials from the Bosque County Historical Commission, hosted by the Portal to Texas History

 
1854 establishments in Texas
Populated places established in 1854